Captain Neikezhakuo Kengurüse, MVC (15 July 1974 – 28 June 1999) was an Indian Army officer from Nagaland.

Kengurüse was an officer of 2 Rajputana Rifles, who was posthumously awarded the Maha Vir Chakra, India's second highest gallantry award, for his exemplary valour in combat during operations in the Kargil War in 1999.

Early life
Kengurüse was born at Nerhema village in Kohima District, Nagaland, India. His father was Neisielie Kengurüse. He had two brothers named Ngseue Kengurüse and Atoulie Kengurüse. He did his schooling at St. Xavier School in Jalukie and graduated from Kohima Science College.

He worked as a teacher at the Government High School in Kohima from 1994 to 1997.

Military career
Kengurüse passed the Combined Defence Services Examination in 1996 and joined the Indian Military Academy, Dehradun in Jun 1997 to fulfill his dream of serving the Indian army.

Kengurüse was commissioned into the Army Service Corps of the Indian Army on 12 December 1998, and was in the midst of his field attachment with the 2nd Rajputana Rifles battalion.

He was fondly nicknamed Neibu by his family and friends. Some soldiers under his command called him Nimbu Sahib (Lemon Sir). A memorial was constructed at Pheza Village in his memory.

Kargil War 
On 28 June 1999, at Lone Hill, Drass sector as the commander of Ghatak platoon, a commando platoon, Kenguruse was assigned the task to evict Pakistani soldiers holding a machine gun post at Black Rock, Dras Sector and to capture the area. Kengurüse established foothold for his platoon at 16000 feet (environmental temperature was at -10 deg. Celsius).

Being inspired by the renowned headhunter Perheile, who was his great great grandfather, Kengurüse had to climb barefeet as he realised that his shoes are having gripping problem in the rocks. Without his shoes, Kengurüse reached the top and  killed 2 infiltrators with his rifle and other 2 enemies in a hand-to-hand combat despite being shot in his abdomen.

Capt. Kengurüse is one of the top 15 decorated soldiers and officers of Kargil War.

Maha Vir Chakra 
The citation for the Maha Vir Chakra reads as follows:

Honour
 The Army Service Corps in Bangalore has an entrance gate named in his honour.
 There is a statue of Capt Neikezhakuo Kengurüse near the gate of the Army Service Corps Centre (South).

See also
Padmapani Acharya

References

Indian military personnel killed in action
People of the Kargil War
Recipients of the Maha Vir Chakra
1999 deaths
People from Kohima district
People from Kohima
1974 births
Indian Army officers
Kargil War